Telford's Warehouse is located between Raymond Street and Tower Wharf, Chester, Cheshire, England, alongside the Shropshire Union Canal.  It is recorded in the National Heritage List for England as a designated Grade II listed building.

History

The building was constructed in about 1790, and designed by Thomas Telford.  Part of it is built over the canal to allow boats to be loaded or unloaded within the building.  In the 1980s it was converted into a public house and restaurant under the direction of the local architect James Brotherhood.  It was badly damaged by a fire in 2000, and has since been restored.

Architecture

It is built in brown brick with grey slate roofs.  It is in two blocks, that facing Raymond Street having two storeys, and the block facing Tower Wharf with three storeys.  In the smaller block the face overlooking the canal has two arches to allow for the entrance of boats for unloading.  On the corresponding face of the larger block are loading bays in each floor, now converted into windows.  The windows elsewhere are sashes.

See also

Grade II listed buildings in Chester (north and west)

References

External links
Website of public house

Commercial buildings completed in 1790
Grade II listed buildings in Chester
Pubs in Chester
Works of Thomas Telford
Grade II listed pubs in Cheshire
1790 establishments in England